Roma Union of Serbia (URS) is a political party in Serbia representing the Romani minority. It was founded in May 2004. Its current leader is Željko Todić.

Miloš Paunković and Rajko Đurić previously served as party presidents. The party took part in the 2007 Serbian parliamentary election as an independent list and won one seat.

References

External links
Roma Union of Serbia

Political parties of minorities in Serbia
Romani in Serbia
Romani political parties